Iridomyrmex brennani is a species of ant in the genus Iridomyrmex. Described recently in 2011, specimens were collected from Victoria, South Australia and Western Australia in the Kambalda district.

Etymology
The species is named after Dr. Karl Brennan, who collected specimens in the Kambalda District where the species was found.

References

Iridomyrmex
Hymenoptera of Australia
Insects described in 2011